Tom Rossin (born August 29, 1933) is an American attorney and politician who served as a member of the Florida Senate from 1994 to 2002. From 2000 to 2002, Rossin also served as Senate Minority leader.

Early life and education 
Rossin was born in New York City in 1933. He earned a Bachelor of Science degree from Columbia University and relocated to Florida to earn a Juris Doctor from the University of Miami School of Law.

Career 
Prior to entering politics, Rossin worked as an attorney and banking consultant. Florida Senate from 1994 to 2002. From 2000 to 2002, Rossin also served as Senate Minority leader.

2002 Florida gubernatorial election 

In 2002, he was chosen as the running mate of Democrat Bill McBride in the 2002 Florida gubernatorial election. McBride and Rossin lost to incumbent Jeb Bush and Frank Brogan.

References

External links

|-

Florida state senators
1933 births
Living people